Princess Inikpi was the virgin princess of the Igala Kingdom, buried alive to save the kingdom from the doom of the Igala-Benin war in 1515-1516 during the rein of Ata Ayegba Oma-idoko. Her status is still standing at her burial spot at Ega market close to river Niger in Idah, Kogi State Nigeria. Many Igala have named their daughters after her.

Inikpi was the protagonist in the 2020 film The Legend of Inikpi, directed by Frank Rajah Arase.

Histories 
The Igala kingdom  sovereignty, peace and existence was perpetually threatened by the then Benin kingdom. To avert the impending doom of war and grant the kingdom victory, Princess inikpi the only daughter of the King became the sacrificial lamb requested by the oracle. Princess Inikpi offers herself to be sacrificed despite resistance by the King Ayegba.

References 

16th-century Nigerian women
Princesses
Deaths by live burial